Pont-Saint-Esprit (literally "Holy Spirit Bridge") is a commune in the Gard département in southern France. It is situated on the river Rhône and is the site of a historical crossing, hence its name. The Ardèche flows into the Rhône, just to the north of the bridge. The residents are called Spiripontains.

History

The bridge was observed by the Irish pilgrim Symon Semeonis in 1323 on his way to the Holy Land: "Pont-Saint-Esprit where there is a famous stone bridge over the Rhône, half a mile in length, the height of which and the breadth of its arches are greatly admired by all those who cross over it." Italian Canon Antonio de Beatis described the bridge in his 1517-1518 travel journal: "This has twenty tall, wide arches, is finely built in a pleasing stone and is still better paved."

Geography

Climate

Pont-Saint-Esprit has a hot-summer Mediterranean climate (Köppen climate classification Csa).

Bouvier family origins
Pont-Saint-Esprit is famous as the town of origin of Michel Bouvier, a cabinetmaker, who was the ancestor of John Vernou Bouvier III, father of Jacqueline Kennedy.

1951 mass poisoning incident

On 15 August 1951, an outbreak of poisoning, marked by acute psychotic episodes and various physical symptoms, occurred in Pont-Saint-Esprit.  More than 250 people were involved, including 50 persons interned in asylums and four deaths. Most academic sources accept naturally occurring ergot poisoning in rye flour as the cause of the epidemic, while a few theorize other causes such as poisoning by mercury, mycotoxins, or nitrogen trichloride.

Population

International relations
Pont-Saint-Esprit is twinned with:
  Egelsbach, Germany
  Haverhill, United Kingdom
  Penacova, Portugal

See also
 Communes of the Gard department

Notes and references

Further reading
 John G. Fuller, The Day Of St. Anthony's Fire (New York: The MacMillan Company, 1968).

External links

 Tourism office website
 Document BBC Radio 4 programme on the Le Pain Maudit

Communes of Gard
Populated places on the Rhône
Populated riverside places in France